Hugh Russell Blackburn (November 4, 1887 – September 29, 1950) was an American baseball pitcher in the Negro leagues. He played with the Kansas City Monarchs in 1920.

References

External links
 and Seamheads

Kansas City Monarchs players
1887 births
1950 deaths
Baseball players from Missouri
Baseball pitchers
People from Sweet Springs, Missouri
20th-century African-American people